Colleen is the third studio album by Australian recording artist Colleen Hewett. The album was released in 1983 by Avenue Records.

Track listing
 "When The Feeling Comes Around" (Rick Cunha) - 3:20
 "Tell Me That You Love Me" (S.Gibb, B.Cason) - 3:20
 "The Wind Beneath My Wings" (Jeff Silbar, Larry Henley) - 3:20
 "What Could You Know About Love" (S.Gibb, B.Cason) - 3:05
 "I Hope I Never" (Tim Finn) - 4:20
 "Hearts (Our Hearts)" (D.Allen, K.Beal) - 3:13
 "Dreaming My Dreams with You" (Allen Reynolds) - 3:45
 "Since I Loved Like That" (Sandy Mason) - 2:15
 "Gigolo" (R.Soja, F.Dostal) - 3:14
 "What If You Fell In Love" (Even Stevens) - 3:22
 "When I Dream" (Sandy Mason) - 3:36
 "Motion" (Allen Toussaint) - 4:53

Charts

References

1983 albums
Colleen Hewett albums